Once Upon a Crime is the fourth book of the Sisters Grimm children's fantasy mystery series by Michael Buckley. It was published in 2007. The story revolves around the detectives Sabrina and Daphne Grimm and features characters from A Midsummer Night's Dream.

Synopsis
Daphne and Sabrina Grimm go back to their home town New York City to find out who killed King Oberon, Puck's father.

Plot
Henry and Veronica Grimm are still under a sleeping spell and Puck, their fairy friend, is terribly sick after being attacked by the Jabberwocky. Puck is rapidly running out of time so Granny Relda, Mr. Canis, Mr. Hamstead, and the girls are taking Puck to Faerie, where Puck's family live, where they hope he will be able to help. Sabrina is astonished to discover that Faerie lies in the heart of her old home, New York City. To make matters even more complicated she learns that Puck is the son of the King of Faerie, Oberon himself. Apparently, Puck was banished by his father and Oberon is not inclined to help Puck now, even though his son is terribly sick. Finally, his wife Titania persuades Oberon to allow Puck to be healed but soon after the process is begun Oberon is poisoned and dies. It isn't long before the Grimms find themselves deeply involved in an investigation to find out who murdered Oberon. It appears that Cobweb, a fairy, did the deed. He certainly is on the run and therefore appears guilty of the crime. And yet something about the whole business does not seem quite right. In addition to the investigation, Sabrina learns that her mother was not the person she thought she was. Veronica wanted to be a part of the Grimm legacy, and help the fairytale community.

Puck's history surprises the Grimm family, when it is revealed that he was engaged, his ex-fiancée a pretty fairy called Moth. She seems to hate Sabrina because she believes that she (Sabrina) likes Puck. Puck's healing cocoon, where his body is stored while it recovers, chooses Sabrina as its protector, revealing that she is the one person that he trusts above everyone else. Eventually, Moth asks Sabrina to do a special honor to Puck's cocoon. She gives Sabrina a drink that happens to be poisoned. As Sabrina suffers in pain Moth reveals that she poisoned Oberon. Fortunately, Puck hatches from his cocoon just in time to get her out of the nasty situation, and into a cocoon of her own in the process.

Later, Sabrina emerges from her cocoon, which helped her survive. She is eager to know whether Moth was a member of the Scarlet Hand, but to her disappointment, she isn't. The girls, Granny and Puck then discover Veronica's journal of fairy tale accounts in the possession of Mr. Diggs, otherwise known as the Wizard of Oz. He reveals that he was the one that put the mark on Oberon's corpse, and then sends a six-story robot in the shape of the wicked witch of the west to kill them, but fails.

Puck becomes the leader of the fairies after his father's funeral and lets Sabrina make a speech that her mother wrote to all of the Everafters in New York, encouraging them to work together. The family then leave, but Sabrina is a little sad/down when Puck doesn't come to say goodbye, only to discover that he is coming home with them - atop the witch robot. Sabrina suppresses her happiness that he coming with them.

References 

2007 American novels
2007 children's books
American children's novels
American fantasy novels
American mystery novels
Children's fantasy novels
Children's mystery novels
Novels set in New York City
Novels based on A Midsummer Night's Dream